Andrea Horváthová (born 5 October 1995) is a Slovak footballer who plays as a midfielder and has appeared for the Slovakia women's national team.

Career
Horváthová has been capped for the Slovakia national team, appearing for the team during the 2019 FIFA Women's World Cup qualifying cycle.

References

External links
 
 
 

1995 births
Living people
Slovak women's footballers
Slovakia women's international footballers
Women's association football midfielders
Expatriate women's footballers in Poland
Slovak expatriate sportspeople in Poland
KKS Czarni Sosnowiec players